Khonoma Basa is a village in Kohima district of the Nagaland in the nation of India.

References

Villages in Kohima district